Clinopodium glabellum, the glade calamint, is a species of flowering plant in the mint family. It is native to the Nashville Basin of Tennessee, the Bluegrass Region of Kentucky, and two counties in Alabama. Within this range, it is found only on wet cedar glades and in seeps along limestone creekbeds. Due to its narrow range and specific habitat requirements, this species is considered vulnerable.

It is a small perennial, often flowering in the first year. It produces pale pink flowers in late spring.

Clinopodium glabellum has been confused with Clinopodium arkansanum, which has caused the known range of both species be somewhat unclear. Clinopodium glabellum has sometimes been called "Ozark calamint", which is misleading as the Ozark populations appear to be Clinopodium arkansanum.

References

glabellum
Flora of Alabama
Flora of Kentucky
Flora of Tennessee
Endemic flora of the United States
Plants described in 1803
Taxa named by André Michaux